Auraticoccus monumenti is a Gram-positive and strictly aerobic bacterium from the genus Auraticoccus which has been isolated from a sandstone monument in Salamanca, Spain.

References 

Propionibacteriales
Bacteria described in 2011